Neurophyseta dabiusalis is a moth in the family Crambidae. It is found in Mexico.

The wingspan is about 18 mm. The base of the forewings is white up to a fine medial black line and almost entirely suffused with cinnamon buff, leaving a little white on the costa and along the line. The hindwings are white, with a short antemedial line on the inner margin.

References

Moths described in 1924
Musotiminae